Ali Shafizadeh is an Iranian businessman.

Business career

Esteghlal Ahvaz
He is the owner of Iran's Premier Football League club Esteghlal Ahvaz F.C. who he bought in 2002.

Over the years he has bought numerous players for substantial fees, including Adriano Alves, Abdul-Wahab Abu Al-Hail and Saša Ilić, and coaches such as Croatian Luka Bonačić and Serbian Srđan Gemaljević. In 2004 Shafizadeh put a $5 million unsuccessful bid to bring Brazilian superstar Rivaldo to the Takhti Stadium.

Shafizadeh sparked much controversy on February 15, 2007 when he announced Esteghlal Ahvaz F.C. were to withdraw from IPL. However, the team appeared two days later in a league match against Persepolis F.C. which ended 1-0 to Esteghlal Ahvaz, dismissing these claims and led people to believe it was all tactical games before one of the biggest games of their season versus Persepolis.

Esteghlal Kish
Shafizadeh also owned the Azadegan League club Esteghlal Kish F.C., which is based in Kish Island in the Persian Gulf, from 2002 to 2006, until it was bought by Shahrdari Bandar Abbas F.C.

Notes

Iranian businesspeople
Iranian football chairmen and investors
Year of birth missing (living people)
Living people
Iranian sports executives and administrators